The Burning Circle and Then Dust is the fourth studio album by the American dark wave band Lycia, released on April 3, 1995 by Projekt Records. It was remastered and edited to fit on a single disc and re-released by Silber Records in 2006.

Reception 

Ned Raggett of AllMusic gave it 4 out of 5 stars, praising it as being "a high point of American dark rock" and the band's greatest and most ambitious work.

Accolades

Track listing 
All songs composed by Lycia.

Personnel 
Adapted from The Burning Circle and Then Dust liner notes.

Lycia
 David Galas – bass guitar, keyboards, engineering, programming
 Tara VanFlower – vocals
 Mike VanPortfleet – vocals, guitar, keyboards, programming

Production and additional personnel
 Kevin Gray – mastering
 Ryan Lum – mastering
 Lycia – production

Release history

References

External links 
 
 The Burning Circle and Then Dust at Bandcamp
 The Burning Circle and Then Dust at iTunes

1995 albums
Lycia (band) albums
Projekt Records albums